María José Maldonado Gómez (born October 26, 1985) is a Paraguayan singer, model and beauty pageant titleholder who represented Paraguay at Miss Universe 2007 pageant.

About
She is a professional Attorney at Law, graduated at the National University of Asuncion (UNA) class 2009, distinguished student on the honor roll.

Maldonado was appointment Ambassador and Messenger of Peace International from Paraguay to the United Nations, in South Korea on 27 June 2010, by Mr Chungwon Choue, President of the GCS International (Goodwill, Cooperation and Service) and also President of the World Taekwondo Federation.

Beauty pageants
On 17 March 2007, she was crowned Miss Universo Paraguay 2007, and represented her country in the Miss Universe 2007. The competition was held on 28 May 2007, in Mexico City, Mexico. She also represented her country in Reina Hispanoamericana 2007 held in Santa Cruz, Bolivia, and she was first runner-up "Princesa Hispanoamericana", first runner-up in Miss Aerosur, Best Costume and Miss Photogenic.

Singing competition
After her participation in the 2007 Miss Universe pageant she competed in Cantando por un sueño, a singing competition in Paraguay, based on the British program It Takes Two, in November 2007 during the final show, Maria and her partner, Sebastián Castillo, were placed second in the competition.

External links and References
  
Article on Maria as Miss Paraguay 2007
Photo Gallery of Miss Paraguay 2007

1985 births
Living people
Miss Universe 2007 contestants
Paraguayan female models
Paraguayan beauty pageant winners